The 1965 World Table Tennis Championships women's doubles was the 27th edition of the women's doubles championship.
Cheng Min-chih and Lin Hui-ching defeated Noriko Yamanaka and Masako Seki in the final by three sets to nil.

Results

See also
List of World Table Tennis Championships medalists

References

-
1965 in women's table tennis